The 2006 Atlantic Sun men's basketball tournament was held March 2–4, 2006 at the Memorial Center at East Tennessee State University in Johnson City, Tennessee. 

 defeated top-seeded rival  in the championship game, 74–69, to clinch their first Atlantic Sun men's basketball tournament.

The Bruins, therefore, received the Atlantic Sun's automatic bid to the 2006 NCAA tournament. This was Belmont's first appearance in the Division I tournament.

Format
The Atlantic Sun saw some significant membership changes prior to the 2005–06 season, even though the A-Sun remained fixed at 11 programs. Long-time member Georgia State departed for the CAA, Central Florida joined Conference USA, and Troy (formerly Troy State) left for the Sun Belt. Meanwhile, the conference added three new members: East Tennessee State (from the SoCon), Kennesaw State (from Division II), and North Florida (also from Division II). 

Nonetheless, no changes were made to the tournament format. Only the top eight teams from the conference tournament were eligible for the tournament. These eight teams were seeded based on regular season conference records and were all entered into the quarterfinal round.

Bracket

References

ASUN men's basketball tournament
Tournament
Atlantic Sun men's basketball tournament
Atlantic Sun men's basketball tournament